This is a timeline of the history of New Zealand's involvement with Antarctica.

Pre 1900s 
1838–1840
French and American expeditions, led by Jules Dumont d'Urville and Charles Wilkes. John Sac, a Māori travelling with Wilkes, becomes the first New Zealander to cross the Antarctic Circle.
1895
New Zealander Alexander von Tunzelmann becomes the first person to set foot on Antarctica, at Cape Adare.
1899
February British expedition led by Carstens Borchgrevink, including several New Zealanders, establishes first base in Antarctica, at Cape Adare. This expedition becomes the first to winter over on the continent.

1900s 
1902
 Scott Island (formerly Markham Island) was discovered and landed upon by William Colbeck (seaman).

1910s 
1910
 Robert Falcon Scott leaves for Antarctica from Port Chalmers. Scott's party later died on the return journey after being delayed by a blizzard.
1911–1914
Four New Zealanders (H Hamilton, AJ Sawyer, EN Webb, and LA Webber) are members of Douglas Mawson's Australian Antarctic expedition.

1920s 
1923
 Ross Dependency proclaimed on 30 July as a British Territory entrusted to New Zealand.
1928
 US Navy Rear Admiral Richard Evelyn Byrd leaves Dunedin for the first sea-air exploration expedition to the Antarctic. Byrd overflew the South Pole with pilot Bernt Balchen on 28 and 29 November 1929, to match his overflight of the North Pole in 1926.
1929
Combined UK-Australia-NZ expedition led by Douglas Mawson; New Zealand members include RA Falla and RG Simmers.

1930s 
1933
 New Zealand Antarctic Society founded.

1940s 
1946
New Zealand joins the International Whaling Commission to help oversee whaling in the southern ocean.
1949
First publication of New Zealand Antarctic Society quarterly journal, Antarctic

1950s 
1955
In August, The New Zealand Government decide to establish an Antarctic base as part of its contribution to International Geophysical Year (1957–58).
1956
 McMurdo Station established; construction of both Scott Base and Amundsen–Scott South Pole Station started.
1957
20 January Scott Base established in Ross Dependency.
 New Zealand Geological Survey Antarctic Expedition (NZGSAE) of 1957–58; named the Borchgrevink Glacier.
 Hallett Station South of Cape Adare is established as a joint New Zealand-United States operation.
 Bill Cranfield, John Claydon, and a New Zealand scientist arrived at the South Pole by air aboard a US Navy airplane;
1958
4 January Edmund Hillary, leading an expedition using farm tractors equipped for polar travel, arrives at the Pole, the first expedition since Scott's to reach the South Pole over land; part of the Commonwealth Trans-Antarctic Expedition. Hillary was the first New Zealander to reach the South Pole overland.
 New Zealand Geological Survey Antarctic Expedition (NZGSAE) of 1958–59; named the Mountaineer Range.
United States Operation Deep Freeze starts, based in Christchurch.
1959
1 December Antarctic Treaty signed with other countries involved in scientific exploration in Antarctica.
New Zealand Department of Scientific and Industrial Research (DSIR) established an Antarctic Division.

1960s 
1964
January Walter Nash becomes the first Prime Minister of New Zealand to visit Antarctica.
 Hallett Station destroyed by fire. It is not rebuilt but is used as a summer-only base until 1973.
1965
The first flight from New Zealand to Antarctica made by a Royal New Zealand Air Force C130 (Hercules) aircraft
1968
 Marie Darby becomes first New Zealand woman to visit the Antarctic
1969 
 New Zealand Geological Survey Antarctic Expedition (NZGSAE) of 1969–70; visited the Scott Glacier and named Marble Peak and Surprise Spur.
12 November South Pole visited for the first time by women – four Americans, an Australian, and New Zealander Pamela Young
 Vanda Station manned for the first time

1970s 
1970
 Antarctic Amendment Act comes into force.
1972–1974
First solo voyage to Antarctica, by New Zealand-born yachtsman and author David Lewis
1974
December Joint NZ-France expedition makes first ascent, and descent into crater, of Mount Erebus.
Antarctic Museum Centre opened at Canterbury Museum in Christchurch.
1975
Prime Minister Bill Rowling had a formal proposal made at the Oslo Meeting for Antarctic to be declared a World Park.
1976
 Thelma Rogers, of New Zealand's DSIR, becomes the first woman to winter over on Antarctica.
1977
New Zealand proclaims Exclusive Economic Zone of 200 nautical miles (370 km), which provides for the zone to also include Ross Dependency's waters.
1978
21st Anniversary of Scott Base
1979
 The Mount Erebus disaster: an Air New Zealand DC-10 crashes and 257 people die.

1980s 
1980
New Zealand is signatory to the Convention on the Conservation of Antarctic Marine Living Resources, which comes into effect in 1982.
1982
20 January Rob Muldoon becomes the first sitting Prime Minister of New Zealand to visit Antarctica.
June Antarctic Treaty nations meet in Wellington to discuss the exploitation of Antarctica's minerals.
1987
Closure of Scott Base Post Office (reopened in 1994)

1990s 
1995
Closure of Vanda Station
1996
 Antarctica New Zealand established on 1 July to manage the Government's interest in Antarctica.

2000s 
2006
 October (to January 2007): New Zealanders Kevin Biggar and Jamie Fitzgerald become the first people to walk to the South Pole without the aid of any supply dumps. Their plan to parasail back is abandoned.
2007
Prime Minister Helen Clark and Sir Edmund Hillary (aged 87) travel with an official party to Scott Base to celebrate the fiftieth anniversary of its founding.
 4 June First New Zealand Antarctic Medal (NZAM) awarded to geophysicist Dr Fred Davey.

References

External links 
 Antarctica New Zealand website
 New Zealand Antarctic Society
 New Zealand Antarctic Medal

New Zealand and the Antarctic
Antarctica
History of Antarctica
Antarctica
Regional timelines
History of the Ross Dependency